James Credle (born February 7, 1945) is an American academic administrator, counselor, and Veterans and LGBT rights activist. He was assistant dean of student affairs at Rutgers University–Newark and is a founding member of several Veterans and LGBTQ associations. For his heroic actions in the Vietnam War, Credle received the Purple Heart, Bronze Star Medal with "V" device, Gallantry Cross, and an Army Commendation Medal.

Early life 
Credle was born on February 7, 1945, in Mesic, North Carolina during the time of Jim Crow laws. He was one of 14 children. His mother was a dayworker and his father worked part-time as a carpenter. Credle and his siblings worked through high school to supplement the family income. He worked in fields picking cotton, potatoes, corn, and cabbage. He later worked in a crab factory. His family were members of Mount Olive Baptist Church where he sang in the choir. Credle graduated from the all-black Pamlico County Training School in 1962. He moved that year moved to Newark, New Jersey to work at the Veteran's Administration Hospital in Lyons with his aunt and uncle.

Career and activism 
Credle worked for three years at the Veterans' Administration Hospital in Lyons, New Jersey. In 1965, he was drafted into the army and served two years in the military. He underwent medic training at Fort Devens. From 1966 to 1967, he was in Vietnam serving as a Spec 4 medic for the 196th Light Infantry Brigade. In Tây Ninh Province, Credle was wounded but continued to help other soldiers evacuate while under enemy fire.

He returned to Newark shortly after the 1967 Newark riots. Within a month, Credle returned to work at the Lyons VA Hospital. He attended Rutgers University–Newark from 1968 to 1972 under the G.I. Bill and received a B.A. in sociology. Credle graduated third in his class. He started all four years on the Rutgers–Newark Scarlet Raiders basketball team and served as captain twice. Credle was a member of the Black Organization of Students (BOS) and Tau Kappa Epsilon. Along with other BOS members, Credle participated in a 72-hour occupation at Rutgers Conklin Hall protesting for increased opportunities and access for minority students, staff, and faculty at Rutgers–Newark.

He spent one semester at Rutgers Law School before obtaining the position of director of the office of veterans affairs at Rutgers–Newark. In 1976, Credle became assistant dean of student affairs at Rutgers. His responsibilities there included acting as the director of the office of veterans affairs. Credle worked at Rutgers for 37 years.

Credle was also a founding member and chairperson for the New Jersey Association of Veterans Program Administrators and the minority affairs director for the National Association of Concerned Veterans. He was a founding member of the National Association for Black Veterans, vice chair of the New Jersey Agent Orange Commission, and the executive director of the National Council of Churches' Veterans in Prisons program. Credle is a founding member and previous co-chair of the National Association of Black and White Men Together and the New York Men of All Colors Together.

Credle is a co-founder and board member of Newark Pride Alliance and a member of the Newark Commission on LGBT Concerns.

Personal life 
Although Credle knew he was gay in 1965, he did not tell the United States Army. Credle believed serving in the war was the right thing to do and did not want to disqualify himself. In 1967, he had his first sexual relationship with a man during R&R in Tokyo. Credle ended the relationship when it was clear that the man was married to a woman. In 1968, Credle began an 11-year relationship with a fellow Rutgers–Newark student and basketball player.

On the morning of October 21, 2013, the first day New Jersey allowed same-sex marriage, Credle married Pierre Dufresne. The wedding was officiated by Cory Booker at Newark City Hall. Credle has experienced posttraumatic stress disorder from his military service.

Awards and honors 
For his heroic actions in the Vietnam War, Credle received the Purple Heart, Bronze Star Medal with "V" device, Gallantry Cross, and an Army Commendation Medal.

References 

1945 births
Living people
People from Pamlico County, North Carolina
People from Newark, New Jersey
Recipients of the Gallantry Cross (Vietnam)
United States Army soldiers
United States Army personnel of the Vietnam War
Military personnel from North Carolina
African-American United States Army personnel
Combat medics
American LGBT military personnel
Activists from North Carolina
African-American activists
American LGBT rights activists
LGBT people from North Carolina
Gay academics
Gay military personnel
LGBT African Americans
American university and college faculty deans
American academic administrators
Rutgers–Newark Scarlet Raiders
Rutgers University–Newark alumni
Rutgers University faculty
LGBT people from New Jersey
American veterans' rights activists
People with post-traumatic stress disorder
Vietnam War casualties
African Americans in the Vietnam War